Delirium is a dystopian young adult novel written by Lauren Oliver, published on January 1, 2011, by HarperCollins (HarperTeen). The story focuses on a young woman, Lena Haloway, who falls in love in a society where love is seen as a disease. Delirium is the first novel in a trilogy, followed by Pandemonium, and Requiem.

Plot
The story is set in Portland, Maine, in the year 2091. Civilization is concentrated in the cities that escaped the severe bombings decades earlier. Travel between these cities is highly restricted. Electric fences separate the city from the Wilds, unregulated territory that was presumably destroyed by bombs.

The totalitarian government teaches that love is a disease, Amor deliria Nervosa, commonly referred to as "the deliria." A surgical cure for deliria has been developed and is mandatory for citizens of at least 18 years old. Lena, an orphan, lives with her aunt, uncle, and two cousins. Lena has a sister, who is "cured" of deliria and married.

Lena's best friend, Hana, is prettier, more popular, and richer than Lena. Lena is obedient, stays home after curfew, and listens to music that is approved by the DFA. Conversely, Hana is rebellious, goes to underground parties after curfew, and listens to music that is banned by the DFA.

However, only months before her scheduled procedure, Lena falls in love with an Invalid (a person who has not taken the Cure and lives in the Wilds), Alex. He was born in the Wilds outside the city and pretends to be cured to live undetected in the city and to partake in the resistance. He offers Lena the means of escape from the procedure that will destroy her ability to love.

While trying to gain Lena's trust and love, Alex finds out about her past life and family. When she mentions her "dead" mother and how she always wore a specific necklace, he knew who she is. 

Alex wants to show Lena that her mother is actually alive. He brings her to the Crypts, where people who do not obey the rules stay, to show her that her mother is still alive. When they find her mother's room, they find it empty, with a life-size hole in the wall where the letter 'O' is in the word LOVE.

Lena now believes that her entire childhood was a lie and wants to leave the city and go to the Wilds. While Lena and Alex try to escape to the Wilds, the government finds them. Alex tells Lena to not look back and that he will be right there with her, but then she does and realizes that he never moved. She keeps running into the Wilds, where she joins the resistance, leaving Alex to presumably die.

Inspiration
Lauren Oliver has said that the inspiration for Delirium came to her one day at the gym. She had recently read a Gabriel Garcia Márquez essay that stated all books were about either love or death. Since her first book, Before I Fall, was about death, she wanted to write a book about love. At the gym, she was watching a news report about a pandemic, and the two ideas combined in her head to form the central concept of the Delirium books.

Sequels
Delirium is the first installment in the Delirium trilogy. Two books set between the first and second books, Hana and Annabel, were released on February 28 and December 26, 2012 respectively. The second novel in the trilogy, Pandemonium, was released on February 28, 2012. The third and final book in the trilogy, Requiem, was released on March 5, 2013. Another book, set between the second and third books of the trilogy, Raven, was also released March 5, 2013.

The intermediate books were compiled into one book, Delirium Stories subtitled Hana, Annabel, and Raven, released the same date. Alex, also between the first and second books, was released with the first edition of the final book in the trilogy, Requiem.

Adaptation
Fox ordered a television pilot based on Delirium. According to The Hollywood Reporter actress Emma Roberts was cast as Lena Haloway in the main role. In February 2013, Gregg Sulkin was cast as the role of Julian Fineman, one of Lena's love interests, but was changed to be the love interest of her best friend Hana Tate for the show. On February 25, 2013 Daren Kagasoff was cast as Alex Sheathes, the male lead and Lena's love interest. Karyn Usher penned the pilot, with Peter Chernin and Katherine Pope as executive producers. On March 1, 2013, Jeanine Mason was cast as Hana Tate. Fox later declined to pick up the pilot.

The pilot episode was picked up by Hulu and was available to stream for a limited time beginning on June 20, 2014.

Reception
Delirium was a New York Times bestseller. It was released to largely positive reviews, including starred reviews from Kirkus Reviews and the School Library Journal. NPR wrote, "Oliver writes beautifully, with well-measured mastery. The references to The Book of Shhh and The Safety, Health and Happiness Handbook, 12th edition, are exquisitely artful touches."

References

External links
Delirium at Lauren Oliver's website

2011 American novels
American romance novels
American science fiction novels
American young adult novels
Dystopian novels
Novels set in Maine
Culture of Portland, Maine
Fiction set in the 2090s
First-person narrative novels
HarperCollins books